Liz Story (born October 28, 1956) is an American pianist. She was born in San Diego, California, United States, and played classical music as a child. She studied at Juilliard School and was a student at Hunter College when she saw jazz pianist Bill Evans perform at a club in New York City. She dropped out of Hunter and studied jazz piano with Sanford Gold, whom Evans recommended.

Story returned to California, studying music at UCLA and at the Dick Grove Music Workshops. She took a job playing piano at a French restaurant, but the piano lacked a stand for holding up sheet music, so she was compelled to improvise. She sent some tapes of her work to William Ackerman of Windham Hill Records, and he signed her to the label.

Story composed and performed the songs "Forgiveness" and "Worth Winning" for the 1989 film Worth Winning. Her hands were used in the film to simulate the piano playing by actress Madeline Stowe.

Discography 
 Solid Colors (Windham Hill, 1983)
 Unaccountable Effect (Windham Hill, 1985)
 Part of Fortune (Jive/Novus, 1988)
 Speechless (Jive/Novus, 1989)
 Escape of the Circus Ponies (Windham Hill, 1991)
 My Foolish Heart (Windham Hill, 1992)
 The Gift (Windham Hill, 1994)
 Liz Story (Windham Hill, 1996)
 17 Seconds to Anywhere (Windham Hill, 1998)
 Night Sky Essays (DMI, 2005)

References

External links
Official website

1956 births
Living people
American jazz pianists
Windham Hill Records artists
Hunter College alumni
New-age pianists
Musicians from San Diego
Women jazz pianists
20th-century American pianists
Jazz musicians from California
20th-century American women pianists
21st-century American women pianists
21st-century American pianists